Carmen Silva (born 12 October 1979) is a Brazilian taekwondo practitioner from Londrina.

She competed at the 2000 Summer Olympics in Sydney.

References

External links

1979 births
Living people
Brazilian female taekwondo practitioners
Olympic taekwondo practitioners of Brazil
Taekwondo practitioners at the 2000 Summer Olympics
Sportspeople from Londrina
21st-century Brazilian women